Staroec is a village in the municipality of Kičevo, North Macedonia. It used to be part of the former Vraneštica Municipality.

Demographics

According to the 2002 census, the village had a total of 195 inhabitants. Ethnic groups in the village include:

Macedonians 194 
Serbs 1

References

External links

Villages in Kičevo Municipality